In enzymology, a leucine transaminase is an enzyme that catalyzes the chemical reaction

L-leucine + 2-oxoglutarate  4-methyl-2-oxopentanoate + L-glutamate

Thus, the two substrates of this enzyme are L-leucine and 2-oxoglutarate, whereas its two products are 4-methyl-2-oxopentanoate and L-glutamate.

This enzyme belongs to the family of transferases, specifically the transaminases, which transfer nitrogenous groups.  The systematic name of this enzyme class is L-leucine:2-oxoglutarate aminotransferase. Other names in common use include L-leucine aminotransferase, leucine 2-oxoglutarate transaminase, leucine aminotransferase, and leucine-alpha-ketoglutarate transaminase.  This enzyme participates in 3 metabolic pathways: valine, leucine and isoleucine degradation, valine, leucine and isoleucine biosynthesis, and pantothenate and coa biosynthesis.  It employs one cofactor, pyridoxal phosphate.

References

 
 

EC 2.6.1
Pyridoxal phosphate enzymes
Enzymes of unknown structure